The Datze is a river of Mecklenburg-Vorpommern, Germany. It forms a pseudobifurcation: its water northeast of Warlin flows towards Friedland and the Landgraben, and its water southwest of Warlin flows towards Neubrandenburg and the Tollense.

See also
List of rivers of Mecklenburg-Vorpommern

Rivers of Mecklenburg-Western Pomerania
2Datze
Rivers of Germany